Nildeson "Nenei" da Silva Melo (born 29 October 1968 in Rio de Janeiro, Brazil) is a retired Brazilian and naturalized Salvadoran football player, who played as a striker.

Club career
He arrived in El Salvador in 1989 to play for Luis Ángel Firpo after a couple of seasons at home with Grêmio. He had a season at Atlético Marte in between two seasons with Firpo and he would go to Costa Rica to play for CS Herediano scored 21 goals in 1992.

Mexico
His success caught the attention of Mexican club Toluca of the Mexican Primera División that year. He would end up playing for various clubs in Mexico. In 1997, he would reach the finals with Toros Neza but end up losing the finals. While still at the books of Toros Neza, Nildeson was jailed and prosecuted by his former girlfriend over not paying up alimony.

Back in El Salvador
In 1998, he returned to El Salvador to have his second stint with Luis Ángel Firpo. He became a Salvadoran citizen and was able to represent El Salvador. He was later cut by Armando Contreras who had taken the position after Juan Ramón Paredes stepped down of the national team. He would later play for Chalatenango, FAS and Águila but the latter clubs dismissed him because of indiscipline and apparent drugs abuse. Then, he was give a chance by Atlético Balboa where he would eventually retire in 2005 after reaching the final of the 2004 Apertura. After a knee operation in January 2005 he was dismissed by Balboa citing he would not recover to get back to his former best.

International career
After his naturalisation, Nildeson made his debut for El Salvador in an August 1997 FIFA World Cup qualification match against Costa Rica and has earned a total of 10 caps, scoring 3 goals. He has represented his adopted country in 6 FIFA World Cup qualification matches.

His final international game was a September 2004 World Cup qualification match against Jamaica.

International goals
Scores and results list El Salvador's goal tally first.

Personal life
Nildeson has four younger brothers who also play football: former Flamengo midfielder Nélio, Cruzeiro- and Brazilian World Cup defender Gilberto, Nilberto and Edmilson who both played in Honduras.

References

External links

CBF 

1968 births
Living people
Footballers from Rio de Janeiro (city)
Naturalized citizens of El Salvador
Brazilian emigrants to El Salvador
Association football forwards
Salvadoran footballers
El Salvador international footballers
Brazilian footballers
Brazilian expatriate footballers
Salvadoran expatriate footballers
Grêmio Foot-Ball Porto Alegrense players
C.D. Luis Ángel Firpo footballers
C.D. Atlético Marte footballers
Expatriate footballers in Costa Rica
C.S. Herediano footballers
Expatriate footballers in Mexico
Deportivo Toluca F.C. players
C.D. Chalatenango footballers
C.D. Águila footballers
Atlético Balboa footballers
C.D. FAS footballers
Correcaminos UAT footballers
Toros Neza footballers
Liga MX players
Salvadoran expatriate sportspeople in Costa Rica
Salvadoran expatriate sportspeople in Mexico